Belovsky District is an administrative district (raion), one of the nineteen in Kemerovo Oblast, Russia. As a municipal division, it is incorporated as Belovsky Municipal District. It is located in the center of the oblast. Its administrative center is the rural locality (a selo) of Vishnevka. Population:  33,382 (2002 Census);

Geography
Belovsky District is at the center of the Kuznetsk Basin (the "Kuzbass" coal region of the Tom River basin), and is at the center of Kemerovo Oblast.   The district's borders effectively surround the large town of Belovo, Kemerovo Oblast, and is just south of the town of Leninsk-Kuznetsky (city).  The terrain is mostly flat in the center, on the plain of the Inya River as it flows north and west; the Tom River runs north to south along the east border.  Rolling hills rise in the east towards the Kuznetsk Alatau, and towards the Salair Ridge in the west.  Vegetation is steppe and mountain forest-steppe, with patches of forest scattered around the region.

The district is about 100 km west-to-east, and 71 km north-to-south.  It is located about 100 km south of the city of Kemerovo, and 100 km north of Novokuznetsk.  Subdivisions of the district include 8 rural areas, and 47 rural settlements.

Belovsky borders with Krapivinsky District in the north, Novokuznetsky District in the east, Prokopyevsky District in the south, and with Guryevsky District in the west.

Climate
The climate of the district is humid continental (Koppen Dfb). The frost-free period in the north of the district is 145 in north, and the average annual precipitation is 370–495 mm/year.

Economy
The two dominant industries of the district are coal and agriculture.  There are three coal fields in the district: Bachatskij, Shestakov, Karakansky.   15% of the coal production of the Kuznetz basin comes from the Belovsky District.   Agricultureis diverse, with grains, potatoes, livestock and dairy.

References

Sources

External links
 Map of District at Google Maps
 Map of District at OpenStreetMap.org

Districts of Kemerovo Oblast